Hope and Glory is a 1987 comedy-drama war film, written, produced and directed by John Boorman and based on his own experiences of growing up in London during the Second World War. The title is derived from the traditional British patriotic song "Land of Hope and Glory". The film was distributed by Columbia Pictures. The film tells the story of the Rowan family and their experiences as seen through the eyes of the son, Billy (Sebastian Rice-Edwards).

Hope and Glory was a critical and commercial success; it won the Golden Globe Award for Best Motion Picture - Musical or Comedy and received five Academy Award nominations, including Best Picture, Best Director and Best Original Screenplay. It also received 13 BAFTA Award nominations, winning for Best Actress in a Supporting Role (Susan Wooldridge).

Plot
The film begins on 3 September 1939, the day Britain declared war on Germany. It tells the story of the Rowan family, Billy, his sisters Sue and Dawn and his parents Grace and Clive, who live in a suburb of London. Clive joins the army, leaving Grace alone to watch over the children. She almost sends Billy and Susie away from London but pulls them back at the last second on the train platform, when she realizes she cannot bear to be apart from them. Thus Billy stays in London for the first years of the war. Seen through the eyes of 10-year-old Billy, the "fireworks" provided by the Blitz (September 1940 – May 1941) every night are as exciting as they are terrifying and the ruins they leave behind are a fascinating playground for Billy and other boys his age, who are largely unsupervised.

His family does not see things in quite the same way as the bombs continue to drop but their will to survive brings them closer together. The nightly raids do not provide the only drama, as his older sister Dawn falls for Canadian soldier Bruce, becomes pregnant and finding her life turned upside down, soon discovers the value of her family. When their house burns down (not in an air raid but in an ordinary fire), the family moves to the bucolic Thames-side home of Grace's parents. This provides an opportunity for Billy to spend more time with his curmudgeonly grandfather, who teaches him "the ways of the river".

In the autumn of 1942, Winston Churchill delivers his famous "end of the beginning" speech. Bruce returns from his secret posting and goes AWOL to find Dawn. They are married in the village church; the MPs take him away. That afternoon in the living room, Dawn gives birth to a son, encircled by her family. Billy swoons at the sight. Grace has purchased a house for the family, just down the river, but Billy must go back to London until he can get into the local school. His grandfather drives the miserable boy to his old school, only to find the block filled with screaming, ecstatic children. A stray bomb has destroyed the building, "Thank you Adolf!" one boy cries.

Roaring with laughter, his grandfather drives Billy home. The adult Billy recalls, "In all my life, nothing ever quite matched the  perfect joy of that moment. My school lay in ruins, and the river beckoned with the promise of stolen days". The credits roll over the river, in its autumnal glory, to their laughter and the music of "Land of Hope and Glory".

Cast

In addition, the director’s daughter, Katrine Boorman, appears as Charity while his son, Charley Boorman, appears as the downed Luftwaffe pilot.

Filming locations
According to TCM host Dave Karger's afterword to an April 2021 broadcast of the film, Boorman re-created the street on which he lived. The million-dollar, 40-acre set was the largest constructed in England since World War II.  The main film set was built on the disused runway at the former Wisley Airfield in Surrey and other scenes by the river were shot near Shepperton Lock. Filming also took place in Hightown Road, Ringwood, Hampshire. Filming also occurred at Bray Studios in Berkshire.

Archival film
The "newsreel" footage shown in the local cinema contains scenes from the 1969 film Battle of Britain.

Critical response
Hope and Glory received very positive reviews at the time of its release, and was named one of the best films of 1987 by over 50 critics. Only Broadcast News appeared on more top 10 lists in 1987.

The film was favourably reviewed by critic Pauline Kael in her film reviews collection Hooked:

Critic Emanuel Levy's review was also positive; he wrote: "Director John Boorman offers a warmly nostalgic view of his childhood in a London suburb during WWII."

On Rotten Tomatoes, the film holds a 96% "Fresh" rating based on 23 reviews, with an average rating of 8.3/10.

In 1987, Roger Ebert wrote: "Maybe there is something in the very nature of war, in the power of guns and bombs, that appeals to the imagination of little boys.  Bombers and fighter planes and rockets and tanks are thrilling at that age when you are old enough to understand how they work but too young to understand what they do. John Boorman's Hope and Glory is a film about that precise season in the life of a young British boy who grows up in a London suburb during World War II. The film is first of all a painstaking re-creation of the period. All of the cars and signs look right, and there are countless small references to wartime rationing, as when the older sister draws seams on her legs to make fake nylons. But after re-creating the period, Boorman also reconstructs the very feeling that was in the air. Hope and Glory is an enormous success right now in England, where every frame must have its special memories for British audiences. Through American eyes, it is a more universal film, not so much about war as about memory. When we are young, what happens is not nearly as important as what we think happens. Perhaps that's true even when we are not so young."

Box office
Goldcrest Films invested £1,288,000 in the film and received £1,665,000 making them a profit of £377,000.

The film made £845,927 in the UK.

Awards and nominations

Sequel
A sequel to the film, titled Queen and Country, was made in 2014. The film tells the story of an older Bill Rowan as a soldier during the Korean War.  The film was selected to be screened as part of the Directors' Fortnight section of the 2014 Cannes Film Festival.  It was released generally in 2015.

See also
 BFI Top 100 British films

References

External links
 
 
 
 

1987 films
1980s war comedy-drama films
American war comedy-drama films
British war comedy-drama films
Battle of Britain films
Films directed by John Boorman
Best Musical or Comedy Picture Golden Globe winners
Goldcrest Films films
Columbia Pictures films
Films set in 1939
Films set in 1940
Films set on the home front during World War II
Films shot in Hampshire
Films shot in Surrey
Films shot at Bray Studios
1980s English-language films
1980s American films
1980s British films